Pindrop is the debut studio album by English post-punk band The Passage, released in 1980 by record label Object.

Reception 

Pindrop has received a positive critical reception. NME called it "a word of disciplined intellectual aggression, frantic emotions and powerfully idiomatic musicality". Sounds called the album "as innovative and individual as 154 and Unknown Pleasures were". Trouser Press called it "easily one of the most mysteriously brilliant albums ever".

Track listing
All tracks composed by Dick Witts; all lyrics by Dick Witts except where noted.
Pin side
"Fear"
"Troops Out"
"Carnal"
"Watching You Dance"
"Hunt"
"Anderton's Hall"
"From the Heart"
Drop side
"Locust"
"2711"
"16 Hours" (Witts, Tony Friel)
"Carmen"
"A Certain Way to Go"
"Prelude"

Personnel
The Passage
Dick Witts - vocals, treatments
Technical
Stewart Pickering - engineer
Jeremy Greenwood - cover design

References

External links 

 

1980 debut albums
The Passage (band) albums